Jamie Scott (born 1984) is an English singer, songwriter and producer.

Jamie Scott may also refer to:

Jamie Scott (One Tree Hill), television series character
Jamie Scott (basketball) (born 1994), female American-Canadian basketball player
Jamie Aleshia Scott, American politician
Jamie Scott, of the Scott sisters, convicted of a 1993 armed robbery
Jamie Scott, American bass guitarist, member of many bands including Vain, Road Crew and Vaughn

See also
James Scott (disambiguation)
Jim Scott (disambiguation), / includes Jimmy Scott disambiguation